Moortown may refer to:

Moortown, Leeds, a suburb of Leeds, West Yorkshire, England
Moortown (ward), an electoral ward of the Leeds City Council
Moortown, Lincolnshire
Moortown, County Tyrone, a small village in Northern Ireland
Moortown, Isle of Wight